Marvel Rising: Secret Warriors is a 2018 American made-for-television animated superhero film produced by Marvel Animation, featuring Ms. Marvel, Squirrel Girl, Patriot, and others. It is the first full-length film of the Marvel Rising franchise and was released on September 30, 2018 simultaneously on Disney Channel and Disney XD. The inauguration of a team of new characters gave Marvel a project that would introduce to the public some of the lesser known characters within the universe.

Plot
Kamala Khan is a teenager who lives in Jersey City, New Jersey, and is also an Inhuman with shapeshifting abilities and lives a secret life as the superheroine Ms. Marvel. She idolizes Captain Marvel, but clashes with her mother, who believes her interest in superheroes is time-wasting, and she has yet to overcome all of the unfortunate difficulties of being a rookie superhero. Kamala and her best friend Doreen Green, a fellow superhero known as Squirrel Girl, stop a thief in the park who steals from a food vendor. The thief is Dante Pertuz, who can control and manipulate fire. The girls also meet Victor Kohl, who is tracking Dante and tells them about how he is working to protect Inhumans from their own destructive powers. Victor and Dante both flee the scene before Kamala and Doreen are approached by S.H.I.E.L.D. agents Quake and Patriot, who have also been tracking violent incidents involving Inhumans. The agents leave, and the two friends decide to find Victor and Dante and solve the Inhuman incidents themselves and prove that Inhumans should be seen as heroes and not threats.

America Chavez has her motorcycle stolen by Dante, who is still unwilling to work with Victor, as he hates his powers for how they ruined his life. An accidental gas explosion in the street forces America, Kamala, Doreen and the S.H.I.E.L.D. agents to work together. Shortly after, Quake is arrested by the agency for unsanctioned action in investigating the Inhumans. Kamala flashes back to when her powers were activated by the Terrigen bomb, and fears that Dante might be struggling with his own powers. She and Doreen argue about if they should trust Dante or Victor. Victor propositions Kamala to join his organisation, and fights her when she declines, as he transforms into his superhuman persona, Exile. He reveals that he is working for Hala the Accuser, who is scouting Inhumans to join the Kree, a militaristic alien race. Exile kidnaps Kamala, and she disappears into a portal. Doreen joins together with America and Patriot to rescue Kamala. They help Quake break out of custody, who joins them and reveals she is also an Inhuman. They are also joined by Captain Marvel, who uses her resources to assist the search.

Kamala wakes up to find that she is a captive in a spaceship cell along with Dante. They are forced by Hala the Accuser to fight each other in order to protect their families; however, they work together to outsmart Hala and escape. The pair also rescue the innocent Inhumans from their imprisonment, and join with Lockjaw, a giant bulldog who can teleport. Captain Marvel and the team arrive and help to fight Exile and Hala. Hala is expelled into space and Exile is defeated, but the spaceship is damaged in the fight. Working together and overcoming their doubts, the team safely lands the spaceship on Earth, and Exile flees. Kamala is overjoyed to meet her idol, but Captain Marvel encourages Kamala to forge her own path and not to follow in her footsteps.

The next day, Kamala and Squirrel Girl make amends, before they stumble upon a secret headquarters. Kamala, Doreen, Dante, America, Quake, Patriot and Lockjaw come together to form an "unofficial" superhero team under Captain Marvel's guidance. Quake is appointed as the leader, and the team are told to train in secret, as they name their team the "Secret Warriors". Kamala looks forward to finding out more about Inhumans and their purpose.

Back at the headquarters, Captain Marvel meets with Captain America, who is pleased to see his student Patriot step out of his shadow. He states his interest in working with an underground team of superheroes.

Cast

Production
The movie was first announced on December 7, 2017. Joe Quesada, Dan Buckley, Cort Lane, and Eric Radomski are set to executive produce the film. Those credited as co-executive producers are Stan Lee, Sana Amanat, and Marsha Griffin. Writer for the film is Mairghread Scott with Alfred Gimeno as supervising director.

Music

On August 23, 2018, the film's theme song, "Born Ready", was released on Walt Disney Records VEVO YouTube channel. The song is sung by Dove Cameron, who plays Ghost-Spider in other Marvel Rising media.

Reception

Critical reception 
The review aggregator website Rotten Tomatoes reported an approval rating of 100%, with an average rating of 7.5/10, based on 7 reviews.

Kevin Yeoman of Screen Rant called Marvel Rising: Secret Warriors an "entertaining animated film," saying, "The movie makes a good go of telling a larger story within the confines of a feature-length runtime. There are concessions to be made, however, and they mostly have to do with Kamala’s home life and the development of America Chavez, whose introduction and origin story feel too hasty for what the character deserves. With any luck this won’t be the last fans see of these Secret Warriors, and Disney XD will have another chance to make these characters shine." Megan Damore of CBR.com described Marvel Rising: Secret Warriors as a "fluid transition from the Marvel Rising: Initiation shorts," writing, "With vibrant characters, a heartwarming story and a killer soundtrack, Marvel Rising: Secret Warriors is a joy to watch. In a post-Avengers: Infinity War world, Secret Warriors is like a shot in the arm, brimming with hope and heart. It's rare to find a project so genuine and candid these days, and Secret Warriors manages to pull this off without feeling cheesy or over-sentimental. Even when the credits roll on the feature, it doesn't feel like the end -- not even close. Instead, Marvel Rising: Secret Warriors feels like the bold beginning of a new era for Marvel Animation."

Chelsea Steiner of The Mary Sue referred to Marvel Rising: Secret Warriors as an "entertaining, warm-hearted celebration of diversity and inclusion," asserting "The story of a young superhero struggling to understand and master their powers is not a new one (we’ve had nearly a dozen Spider-Man films covering this terrain), but seeing two girls (one a woman of color) navigating the experience is refreshingly original. The film is packed with powerful female characters, but the story is centered on the friendship between Kamala and Doreen. Kamala’s hesitancy and reserve make her a great foil for the upbeat and wildly optimistic Doreen." Emily Ashby of Common Sense Media gave Marvel Rising: Secret Warriors a grade of 4 out of 5 stars, praised the depiction of positive messages, citing teamwork and perseverance, and complimented the presence of role models, stating the film depict leading and inspiring female characters, while noting the diverse ethnicity across the characters, stating, "The characters' emotional evolution from insecure and standoffish teens to powerful gears in the Secret Warriors machine involves strong themes about self-identity, confidence, cooperation, and embracing one's own uniqueness. Another plus? This Marvel installation makes heroes of several female characters (yay!) who don't fit the archetypal physical template of traditional heroines and bring body type diversity to the mix (double yay!)."

References

External links
 
 

2010s American animated films
2010s animated superhero television films
2018 animated films
2018 television films
Marvel Animation
2018 films
Secret Warriors (franchise)
Animated films based on Marvel Comics